Chelonarium lecontei is a species of turtle beetle in the family Chelonariidae. It is found in North America.

References

Further reading

 

Byrrhoidea
Articles created by Qbugbot
Beetles described in 1867